Pieter de Villiers (born 13 July 1982) is a South African hurdler.

Achievements

Personal bests
400 metres - 46.70 s (2005)
400 metres hurdles - 48.46 s (2005)

External links
 

1982 births
Living people
South African people of French descent
South African male hurdlers
Athletes (track and field) at the 2006 Commonwealth Games
Athletes (track and field) at the 2008 Summer Olympics
Olympic athletes of South Africa
African Games silver medalists for South Africa
African Games medalists in athletics (track and field)
Athletes (track and field) at the 2007 All-Africa Games
Commonwealth Games competitors for South Africa